GTO: 14 Days in Shonan (also known as GTO Shonan 14Days in Japan) is a Japanese manga series written and illustrated by Tooru Fujisawa. It is a side story to the main Great Teacher Onizuka manga series. It was published in Kodansha's Weekly Shōnen Magazine from June 2009 to September 2011, with its chapters collected into nine tankōbon volumes.

Publication
GTO: 14 Days in Shonan, written and illustrated by Tooru Fujisawa, is a side story to the main Great Teacher Onizuka manga series. It was serialized in Kodansha's Weekly Shōnen Magazine from June 10, 2009, to September 14, 2011. Kodansha compiled its chapters into nine tankōbon volumes, released from October 16, 2009, to November 17, 2011. A 3-chapter spin-off, titled Black Diamond, was later published in Weekly Shōnen Magazine in November 2011.

In North America, Vertical announced the English language release of the manga in May 2011. The nine volumes were published from January 31, 2012, to May 28, 2013. Kodansha USA published the volumes digitally on February 1, 2022.

Volume list

References

External links

Great Teacher Onizuka
2009 manga
Interquels
Kanagawa Prefecture in fiction
Kodansha manga
Shōnen manga
Vertical (publisher) titles